Sometimes referred to in literature as 'Bwlch y Gaseg' and in very close proximity to the area named as such on OS Map (six-inch to the mile) 1888-1913, the Cynwyd Forest Quarry is a Site of Special Scientific Interest (SSSI) located aside a track within the Cynwyd Forest near Corwen , Denbighshire, North Wales. It was described by Rushton et al. (2000) and exposes Late Ordovician micaceous siltstones and mudstones of the Dolhir Formation (Ashgill Series, Rawtheyan Stage) which yields a rich shelly (brachiopod) fauna. Trilobites are represented by several genera although the fauna is dominated by Gravicalymene arcuata Price, 1982. Bivalves, bryozoans and various Echinodermata (Crinoids and Cystoids) are also present. Examples of most of the fossils listed below are illustrated and briefly described (or remarked upon) in "Fossils of the Upper Ordovician" by Harper and Owen (Eds.).

Fossils include

Bryozoa:
 Pinnatoporella carinata (Etheridge)
 Phylloporina sp.
 Graptodictya sp.
Brachiopoda:
 Leptaena sp.
Cephalopoda:
 Zitteloceras costatum Teichert.
Trilobita:
 Gravicalymene arcuata Price
 Illaenus (Parillaenus) davisii (Salter)
 Remopleurides cf. nicholsoni Reed
 Pseudospaerexochus cf. conformis (Angelin)
 Pseudospaerexochus octolobatus (McCoy)
 Calyptaulax sp.
 Tretaspis sp.
Crinoidea:
 Cupulocorona rugosa Donovan and Paul
Cystoidea
 Regulaecystis inconstans Paul

Gallery

References

See also
List of Sites of Special Scientific Interest in Clwyd

Sites of Special Scientific Interest in Clwyd
Quarries in Wales